Joseph Depledge (15 April 1897 – 1974) was a footballer who played in the Football League for Stoke. He made five appearances for Stoke.

Career
Depledge was born in Sheffield, and started playing football for Rotherham Town who were playing in the Midland League and he performed well earning him a move to League side Stoke. He played five matches for Stoke in the 1923–24 season and was released by manager Tom Mather at the end of the campaign. He later played for Mansfield Town.

Career statistics

References

English footballers
Mansfield Town F.C. players
Rotherham Town F.C. (1899) players
Stoke City F.C. players
English Football League players
1897 births
1974 deaths
Association football defenders